The Beethoven Frieze is a painting by Gustav Klimt on display in the Secession Building, Vienna, Austria.

Description
In 1901, Klimt painted the Beethoven Frieze for the 14th Vienna Secessionist exhibition in celebration of the composer, and featured a monumental polychrome sculpture by Max Klinger. Meant for the exhibition only, the frieze was painted directly on the walls with light materials. After the exhibition the painting was preserved, although it did not go on display again until 1986. The Beethoven Frieze is on permanent display in the Vienna Secession Building in a specially built, climate-controlled basement room.

The frieze is large, standing at 7 feet high with a width of 112 feet. The entire work weighs four tons.

Depiction on coin

Because of the frieze's fame and popularity, it was made the main motif of a collectors' coin: the Austrian 100 euro Secession Coin, minted on 10 November 2004. The reverse side features a small portion of the frieze. The extract from the painting features three figures: a knight in armor representing "Armored Strength", one woman in the background symbolizing "Ambition" holding up a wreath of victory and a second woman representing "Sympathy" with lowered head and clasped hands.

See also
List of paintings by Gustav Klimt

Notes

External links

 Beethoven Frieze in the online catalog of the Vienna Secession (in German)

 Beethoven Frieze, video discussion about the painting from Smarthistory at Khan Academy

1902 paintings
Paintings by Gustav Klimt
Frieze
Vienna Secession
Paintings in Vienna